= Lomba do Pinheiro =

Neighborhood in Porto Alegre, Brazil

Coordinates: 30°06′00″S 51°07′35″W

Lomba do Pinheiro (meaning Pine Tree Hill in English) is a neighbourhood (bairro) in the city of Porto Alegre, the state capital of Rio Grande do Sul, in Brazil. It was created by Law 7954 from January 8, 1997.

Lomba do Pinheiro is not part of the rural zone in Porto Alegre.
